Thomas J. Mahon (1884 – September 24, 1927) was an American politician and jurist. He was a member of the Wisconsin State Assembly from 1911 to 1913 and judge of the Milwaukee County Civil Court from 1924 to his death in 1927.

Early life
Thomas J. Mahon was born in 1884 in Meeme, Manitowoc County, Wisconsin. Mahon suffered from poliomyelitis during childhood and was confined to a wheelchair. He attended East Side High School in Milwaukee, Wisconsin. Mahon then received a Bachelor of Arts degree from the University of Wisconsin. His thesis at the University of Wisconsin was about the Torrens land transfer system. He received a law degree from the University of Wisconsin Law School.

Career
In 1908, Mahon moved to Eland, Shawano County, Wisconsin where he practiced law. While practicing law in Eland, Mahon represented Shawano County in the Wisconsin State Assembly from 1911 to 1913 and was a Republican. Later, Mahon moved to Milwaukee, Wisconsin and continued to practiced law.

Mahon served as executive counsel for Governor of Wisconsin Francis McGovern from 1913 to 1914. In 1918, Mahon ran for Milwaukee County district attorney and lost the election. In 1923, he was elected school director. On June 2, 1924, Mahon was appointed to Branch 7 of the Milwaukee County Civil Court, succeeding Otto H. Breidenbach.

Personal life
His brother, Ben H. Mahon, was a member of the Assembly and of the Wisconsin State Senate.

Death
Mahon died as a result of a relapse of a nervous and physical breakdown on September 24, 1927, in Milwaukee, Wisconsin.

References

1884 births
1927 deaths
People from Manitowoc County, Wisconsin
People from Shawano County, Wisconsin
Politicians from Milwaukee
University of Wisconsin–Madison alumni
University of Wisconsin Law School alumni
Wisconsin lawyers
Wisconsin state court judges
Republican Party members of the Wisconsin State Assembly
People with polio
20th-century American judges
20th-century American politicians
19th-century American lawyers
20th-century American lawyers